1550 Tito, provisional designation , is a stony asteroid from the middle region of the asteroid belt, approximately 12 kilometers in diameter. It was discovered on 29 November 1937, by Serbian astronomer Milorad B. Protić at the Belgrade Astronomical Observatory in Serbia. It was named for Yugoslavian statesman Josip Broz Tito.

Classification and orbit 
 
This asteroid orbits the Sun at a distance of 1.7–3.3 AU once every 4 years and 1 month (1,482 days). Its orbit has an eccentricity of 0.31 and an inclination of 9° with respect to the ecliptic. Titos observation arc begins 4 years after its official discovery observation, with its first used observation taken at Belgrade in 1941. No precoveries were taken and no prior identifications were made.

Physical characteristics 

In the SMASS classification, Tito is characterized as a common S-type asteroid.

Rotation period 

Tito has a rotation period of approximately 54 hours. While this does not make it a slow rotator, it has a significantly longer period than the vast majority of minor planets, which typically spin every 2 to 20 hours around their axis. Rotational lightcurves of Tito were obtained from photometric observations by Walter R. Cooney Jr. in January 2003, who derived a period of 54.2 hours (Δmag 0.23), by Raymond Poncy in December 2006, who obtained a shorter, provisional period of 30 hours (Δmag 0.16), and by David Higgins in December 2010, who derived a period of 54.53 hours (Δmag 0.40).

Diameter and albedo 

According to the surveys carried out by the Spitzer Space Telescope, the Japanese Akari satellite, and NASA's Wide-field Infrared Survey Explorer with its subsequent NEOWISE mission, Tito measures between 9.47 and 13.652 kilometers in diameter, and its surface has an albedo between 0.181 and 0.257. The Collaborative Asteroid Lightcurve Link assumes a standard albedo for stony asteroids of 0.20 and calculates a diameter of 12.39 kilometers with an absolute magnitude of 11.9.

Naming 

Tito was named in honour of Josip Broz Tito (1892–1980), leader of the Yugoslavian resistance during the World War II, early enthusiast of the United Nations, and president of former Yugoslavia. The official  was published by the Minor Planet Center on 30 January 1964.

References

External links 
 Asteroid Lightcurve Database (LCDB), query form (info )
 Dictionary of Minor Planet Names, Google books
 Asteroids and comets rotation curves, CdR – Observatoire de Genève, Raoul Behrend
 Discovery Circumstances: Numbered Minor Planets (1)-(5000) – Minor Planet Center
 
 

001550
Discoveries by Milorad B. Protić
Named minor planets
001550
19371129
Cultural depictions of Josip Broz Tito